Fraternity Phi Eta Mu is a fraternity founded in Puerto Rico in 1923 at the University of Puerto Rico now University of Puerto Rico, Rio Piedras Campus.  All its founders were Puerto Ricans, born on the island of Puerto Rico.

History
During the 1920s, the most important administrative posts in Puerto Rico were filled by direct appointment of the President of the United States. This had the effect of assigning to positions of great importance people who lacked the temperament or the right qualifications, but possessed the necessary appointments for political connections. One of the most graphic examples of these actions was the appointment of Charles St. John W. Dean of the University of Puerto Rico. His particular style caused a great discord between the administration of the university  and students of the time, and under its purview the first student protest significance and, later, the first university strike at the University of Puerto Rico took place.

On October 16, 1923, a group of students of the College of Pharmacy, College of Liberal Arts and the Normal School (now Faculty of Education) of the University of Puerto Rico collectively owed $841.50. The distribution of this debt ranged from students who owed a dollar to students who owed $18.50. The dean of the College of Pharmacy, Esq. Lucas Luis Velez, St. John, informed the dean that students of this faculty had agreed not to pay their debts related to deposits of materials laboratory equipment. Students understood that they were in fact being required to pay for used equipment they were using at that time as if the equipment were new.

Upon hearing of this action, the dean suspended students of the College of Pharmacy who owed any money for whatever reason, and announced to the press of the island that he had learned that the students of that faculty intended to steal the laboratory equipment. These manifestations of the dean outraged students, who, along with the growing friction from events in the previous year, paved the way for a student movement.

On October 19, 1923, Atty. Juan B. Huyke, Education Commissioner, met with Governor Horace Mann Towner. After the interview, Huyke informed the press that he understood that "students had overstepped by adopting an attitude he considered an act of indiscipline". Students were pressured through innuendos that public opinion and the Faculty of Pharmacy were against them. However, while this press conference was taking place, students were meeting with a prominent faculty member, Prof. Victor Coll y Cuchi, who expressed his support.

Students of the College of Pharmacy received individual support of various students and the formal support of the Class of Fourth Year of the College of Law, chaired by Felix Ochoteco Jr. The Faculty of Law adopted a resolution which determined that the actions of Dean St. John "have not been conformed as per the due consideration to be afforded to students, and therefore expressed their solidarity with them in protest".

On October 22, 1923 the board of trustees of the university met and agreed to require students to prepay for all equipment and tuition, as well as pay for any equipment broken during the academic year.

Students of the College of Pharmacy, who were still under suspension, were outraged upon learning about this decision of the board of trustees and made their displeasure public in the newspaper La Democracia.

Students requested a public apology from the dean. On October 24, 1923, in the face of an imminent student strike meeting, a General Board of the College of Law (the Board) was organized, integrated therein by Felix Ochoteco Jr., Pelayo Román Benítez, Arcilio Alvarado, Rafael Buscaglia and Emilio S. Belavar. This group carried out a strong campaign against the dean St.John. After information about these events reached the Commissioner of Education, and amidst the insistent rumors of a strike, the Dean ordered in November 1 the closure of that Faculty. In addition, the College of Pharmacy is also notified that if they continue with their attitude, they will face the same fate as the Faculty of Law.

	On November 1, with riots in the College of Law, seven students from that college are expelled from the University. Students of the Board, preparing for a possible strike, create a commission for the purpose of raising funds, comprising this committee, among others, Isaias M. Crespo and Antonio R. Barceló.

A few days later a meeting was held where the board reported that the dean of the university would consider the problems solved if a resolution by the College of Law was approved whereby each student is compelled to report any act of protest performed or planned to be performed in the future. Students refused to approve the resolution. On November 5, 1923, to avoid a strike, the dean restored all students suspended and expelled and ordered resumption of classes at the university.

On 17 December 1923, the strike leaders Pelayo Román Benítez, Felix Ochoteco, Isaiah M. Crespo, P. Wilson Colberg, Alfonso Paniagua and Mario Polanco gathered under a gum tree in the grounds of the University of Puerto Rico and founded the fraternity Phi Eta Mu, for the purpose of granting protection and mutual loyalty in the face of repression from the university authorities. They managed thus to establish within the university one of the most serious and more solidly grounded student organizations ever, including a wise Constitution, a comprehensive set of regulations and a refined blend of traditions have placed the fraternity Phi Eta Mu in a place of excellence among Puerto Rican student organizations, a solid grouping of mind and spirit known to have succeeded the test of time.

Founders
The Honorable Fraternity Phi Eta Mu was installed on December 17, 1923, with the following group of young people as its founding members:

 Wilson P. Colberg
 Isaias M. Crespo
 Felix Ochoteco, Jr.
 Alfonso Paniagua
 Mario Polanco
 Pelayo Román Benítez

The late Dr. José Menéndez was presented at the meeting of December 17, 1923 and became the first neophyte of the Honorable Fraternity Phi Eta Mu, thus also becoming part of its first group of directors.

Publications
 Aclaración y Crítica , 1941 by Antonio S. Pedreira; book
 Paliques , 1952 by Nemesio Canales; book
 Poemas de amor, poemas del paisaje, poemas de Dios , 1964 by Josefina Guevara Castañeira; audio
 Edmundo Disdier interpreta a Edmundo Disdier , 1973 by Edmundo Disdier; audio

See also
List of social fraternities and sororities

References

External links
http://www.phietamu.com

Fraternities and sororities in Puerto Rico
Student organizations established in 1923
Concilio Interfraternitario Puertorriqueño de la Florida
1923 establishments in Puerto Rico